Wethersfield Avenue Baseball Grounds, also sometimes known as Clarkin Field or Clarkin's Field (I) was a baseball park located in Hartford, Connecticut. The facility was home to the following minor league teams:
Hartford Atlantic League Bluebirds 1896-1897 / Co-operatives 1898
Hartford Eastern League Indians 1899-1900 / Wooden Nutmegs 1901
Hartford Senators Connecticut League 1902, 1904-1912 / Valley League 1903 / Eastern Association 1913-1914
Hartford Senators Eastern League 1916-1918; 1919-1920

The owners of the Atlantic League franchise built stands for the field for the 1896 season. The ballpark was located at 831 Wethersfield Avenue, and sat between Roosevelt Street and Plymouth Street.

The first Atlantic League game in Hartford was played on April 23, 1896, with Hartford defeating New Haven 16-11. The final Eastern League game in Hartford was a doubleheader on September 11, 1920. Hartford won both games from Waterbury.

James H. Clarkin become owner of the Hartford club in the early 1900s. The Wethersfield Avenue Grounds eventually acquired the secondary name of "Clarkin's Field" in local newspapers.

A new Clarkin Field (II) was built in 1921, to replace the aging Wethersfield Avenue Grounds. The last listing of the old ballpark in Hartford city directories is in the 1921 edition.

References

Sources
Peter Filichia, Professional Baseball Franchises, Facts on File, 1993.
Phil Lowry, Green Cathedrals,  several editions.

External links
Some pictures of the ballpark (along with erroneous text equating this ballpark with Bulkeley Stadium)
More information

Defunct minor league baseball venues
Defunct baseball venues in the United States
Hartford Blues
Sports venues in Hartford, Connecticut
Sports venues in Hartford County, Connecticut